R33 may refer to:

 R-33 (missile), a Soviet air-to-air missile
 R33 (South Africa), a road
 R33 (New York City Subway car)
 HM Airship R.33, of the Royal Air Force
 , a destroyer of the Royal Navy
 , an aircraft carrier of the Indian navy
 Nissan Skyline (R33), a mid-size car
 Nissan Skyline GT-R (R33), a sports car
 R33: Danger of cumulative effects, a risk phrase
 Renard R.33, a Belgian trainer
 Urinary retention
 Wakonda Beach State Airport in Lincoln County, Oregon